Deathswitch was a website that allowed users to store encrypted emails, to be sent out at the time of their death. This was determined by the user entering a password at preset intervals. If the password was not entered after several prompts, the emails would be sent out to the indicated email recipients. The service announced its shutdown on October 22, 2015.

References

External links
 Alt URL

American websites
Internet properties established in 2006
Internet properties disestablished in 2015